Disseminated disease refers to a diffuse disease-process, generally either infectious or neoplastic. The term may sometimes also characterize connective tissue disease.

A disseminated infection, for example, has extended beyond its origin or nidus and involved the bloodstream to "seed" other areas of the body. Similarly, one can view metastatic cancer as a disseminated infection in that it has extended into the bloodstream or into the lymphatic system and thus "seeded" distant sites (a process known as metastasis).

Disseminated disease is often contrasted with localized disease.

References

Diseases and disorders
Medical terminology